Roth station is a railway station in the municipality of Roth, located in the Roth district in Middle Franconia, Germany.

References

Nuremberg S-Bahn stations
Railway stations in Bavaria
Railway stations in Germany opened in 1849
1849 establishments in Bavaria
Buildings and structures in Roth (district)